The Hindu Temple Society of North America is a nonprofit organization that manages the Sri Maha Vallabha Ganapati Devasthanam temple in Flushing, Queens, in New York City. It is known as the Ganesha Temple after its central deity, Ganesha. On July 4, 1977, it had opened the second Hindu temple to be consecrated in the United States. Uma Mysorekar has served as its president since 1994.

Deities 
The central deity of the temple is Ganesha. The sacred images of Venkateswara, Lakshmi, Shiva, Parvati, Durga, Saraswati, Hanuman, Kumbha Chandikeshwara,Dhvani Chandikeshwara, Dakshinamurthy, Gayatri, Shanmukha, Valli, Devasena, Kamakshi, Navagraha, Nagendra Swamy, Navagraha, Raghavendra Swamy, Rama Parivar, Radha-Krishna, Khodiyar Mata, Ayyappan, Agastriyar, and Lopa Mudra, Satyanarayan and Rama Devi, Chandrasekaraswamy and Anandavalli, Atma Linga, Nataraja, Trishula astradeva, Ankusha Astradeva, Sivakami and Manikkavachakar, Swarna Bairavar, Sudarsana and Narasimha, Dhanvantari and Garuda, and Sridevi and Bhumi have also been consecrated within the temple.

History
According to the Department of City Planning, the number of Indians situated in New York City grew from an estimated 6,000 people to 94,000 people, between 1970 and 1990. The increasing number of Indians emigrating to the United States came as a result of the Immigration and Nationality Act of 1965.

Before the Hindu Temple Society of North America was established in 1970, Alagappa Alagappan, one of its founders, hosted meetings for members in his living room. The organization acquired the land of a former Russian Orthodox Church and designed a traditional Hindu temple in its place. The construction was completed in 1977 and the consecration ceremony was performed on July 4, 1977. The design of the temple's exterior was inspired by the face of traditional Hindu temples found in South India.

In October 1998, the temple inaugurated the Ganesha Patasala to be used for youth activities. The patasala offers classes to youths in subjects like mathematics, linguistics, religion, bhajanams, and dance.  

The temple was reconsecrated in 2009.

Leadership 
Dr. Uma Mysorekar began her involvement with the temple services in the mid-1980s and has served as the president since 1994. Mysorekar graduated with a medical degree from Bombay University and practiced as an Obstetrician/Gynecologist. 

Mysorekar has been awarded the Kannada Rajyotsava Award from Karnataka, Ellis Island Medal of Honor, Governor's Award of Excellence, and a "token of esteem" by the City Lore's People's Hall of Fame. She was also chosen by Barak Obama's presidential inaugural committee to join several other religious leaders in the national prayer service, on the day of his inauguration.

Architecture

The temple is constructed using granite. It is entered through a gopuram gateway. The main shrine is dedicated to Lord Ganesha, while other shrines house idols of Lord Balaji, Goddess Mahalakshmi, Lord Hanuman, and Sri Nagendra Swamy. The temple includes a dhvaja sthambha (column) and a rajagopuram (lofty tower). Temple architect Sthapathi Muthiah supervised the reconstruction.

Temple canteen 
Underneath the ground level, the temple houses a vegetarian restaurant called the Temple Canteen. The Temple Canteen was established in 1993.  The canteen feeds 4,000 people a week, with as many as 10,000 during the Deepavali (Diwali) holiday.

Dispute 
At the Hindu Temple Society of North America, a dispute arose in 2003 regarding the leadership of the temple. Six plaintiffs expressed that the temple was being run too autocratically, and wanted the opportunity to vote for a board of trustees. The temple trustees believed that the plaintiffs questioned the leadership because they wanted to gain control of the temple, themselves. Ultimately, judge Joseph Golia ruled that a referee would facilitate an election for a new board of trustees. After the first election, the board of trustees that served the temple previously were re-elected.

Miracles
In September 1995, the Ganesha drinking milk miracle was observed at the temple. It was reported that "People held the spoon filled with milk under the trunk, by the mouth, and the milk would be taken up".

Nearby temples in Flushing
 Asamai Hindu Temple, 45-32 Bowne Street: Representing the ancient Afghan Hindu community, honoring Asamai, the city goddess of Kabul
 BAPS Shri Swaminarayan Mandir,  44-38 Bowne Street: The first Swaminarayan sect temple in North America (inaugurated in 1974).
 Shri Shirdi Sai Baba Temple, 46-16 Robinson Street: dedicated to Shirdi Sai Baba, inaugurated April 2010
 Jain Center of America  43-11 Ithaca Street: Shri Mahavir Swami in the Shwetambar tradition, Upashrayain the Sthanakvasi tradition,  Sri Adinath in the Digambar tradition and Shrimad Rajchandra Meditation Hall.
 John Bowne House, 37-01 Bowne Street, the house of the Bowne family which contributed to religious freedom in USA in the 17th century.
 Om Sai Mandir, 45-11 Smart Street Om Sai Mandir.

See also

Hindu denominations
Hinduism in the West
Indians in Queens
List of Hindu temples in the United States
Sanskrit in the West
List of Hindu empires and dynasties

References

External links

 Official Hindu Temple Society of North America website

1977 establishments in New York City
Ganesha temples
Hindu temples in New York (state)
20th-century Hindu temples
Religious buildings and structures in New York City
Indian-American culture in New York City
Religious buildings and structures completed in 1977
Tamil-American culture
Buildings and structures in Queens, New York
Hindu organizations based in the United States